"Goce Delčev" Brigade was a military unit composed of conscripts and volunteers from Macedonia. The Brigade was named after the IMRO-revolutionary Goce Delčev.

History 

The formation of the Gotse Delchev Brigade started in Sofia after the pro-Soviet coup on September 9, 1944. Then the Bulgarian participation in the war switched against the Third Reich. Its official beginning dates back to September 14, when a decree of the Council of Ministers of the new Fatherland Front Government was adopted for this purpose. According to the order of the General Command, the brigade must act together with the Bulgarian Army. It was urgently equipped, armed and involved in hostilities, and was constantly supplemented with new additions. Petar Traykov was appointed commander. After negotiations with the Yugoslav partisans, it was decided the brigade to be turned over to their command. Initially, it consisted of 4,600 people and was composed of soldiers from Vardar Macedonia who served in the Bulgarian Army during 1941–1944, when the area was under Bulgarian control. Its first battalion was sent to the front in Vardar Macedonia on September 30, and the second on October 7. The Bigade set up and equipped by the Bulgarian government provided the basis for the deployment of considerable troops in Vardar Macedonia.

By order of the General Staff of the Macedonian Partisans, the brigade was assigned to the newly formed partisan Bregalnica-Strumica Corps. The only more substantial changes other than renaming were the joining of few hundred guerrillas. At that time some hostilities continued between the Bulgarian army and the Yugoslav partisans. They arose from previous period when Bulgaria had occupied parts from Yugoslavia. As result by order of Svetozar Vukmanović-Tempo, the initial composition of the Brigade's Headquarters was changed to local people without military education. The Montenegrin Serb Tempo was Josip Broz Tito's personal envoy in Vardar Macedonia. The name of the Brigade Gotse Delchev had also been removed. The Bulgarian epaulets of the officers were removed too, but without being replaced by other distinctive signs. This suppressed the officers who received their ranks in the Bulgarian Army. The soldiers of the brigade took part in assisting the Bulgarian Army in their repulse operation around Bregalnica and Strumica in October and early November. At the end of October, the brigade numbered 6,276 people and 1,286 horses.

After in the mid-November when the Germans retreated the region, the brigade already numbered 12,500 people. It had been finally disbanded by the Yugoslav partisans in December, when its units were attached to the 15th Corps and order was given to be sent to the Srem Front. On December 26, the brigade's artillery platoon stationed at the Skopje Fortress, and one of its infantry platoons at Štip revolted against the order to be sent to the Srem front. They wanted to head to Thessaloniki as presumable capital of an imagined Independent Macedonia. After these in Stip refused to disperse, dozens were shot down and many were arrested on Tempo's order. The officers in Skopje were invited by Gen. Mihajlo Apostolski "for conversation". As soon as they entered the Officers' House, they were disarmed and arrested. Tempo personally led the interrogations of these ca. 70 officers. Svetozar Vukmanović accused them of had fallen under Bulgarian influences. Meanwhile, hundreds of soldiers returned to the Officers' House to find out what is happening to their commanders. They were met with gunfire and dozens were killed. The reason for these military revolts was that Serbs and Montenegrins were appointed as new commanders in these units, who came without officer ranks, but were promoted for a short time. The testimony of the soldiers, who were later interrogated and convicted, states that some Serbian and Montenegrin officers addressed them with the words: "You are Southern Serbs," or cursed them as "damned Bulgarians".

See also
 World War II in Yugoslav Macedonia
 Bulgaria during World War II

Footnotes

Military history of Bulgaria
Military history of North Macedonia
Brigades of the Yugoslav Partisans